The Romance-speaking world, Romanophone world, Neolatin world, or Latin-speaking world, is the part of the world where Romance languages (those evolved from Latin) are either official, co-official, or significantly used, comprising Latin Europe and Latin America, as well as parts of North America and Romance-speaking Africa and Romance-speaking Asia.

It includes, for example, the Spanish-, Galician-, Portuguese-, French-, Italian-, Romanian- and Catalan-speaking communities.

Area, population and GDP of the Romance-speaking world

Spanish-speaking countries

Portuguese-speaking countries

French-speaking countries

Italian-speaking countries

Romanian-speaking countries

Catalan-speaking countries

Total Romance-speaking world

See also
 Latin Union
 Legacy of the Roman Empire

References

Country classifications
Romance languages